Jean Emmanuel Victor Maleb (born 7 July 1986) is a Vanuatuan former footballer who is last known to have played as a striker for Yatel. He was a Vanuatu international.

Career

Maleb trialed for the youth academy of Southampton in the English Premier League. In 2004, Maleb signed for New Zealand side Southern United. After that, he signed for Yatel in Vanuatu.

References

External links
 

Vanuatuan footballers
Southern United FC players
Living people
Association football forwards
1986 births
Shepherds United F.C. players
Vanuatu international footballers
Vanuatuan expatriate footballers
Expatriate association footballers in New Zealand